Li Dan (李丹) (born 1978) is a Chinese HIV/AIDS activist. In 2003, he established an AIDS orphanage in Shangqiu, Henan. He was the recipient of the Reebok Human Rights Award in 2006.

He is the founder and chairman of the China Women's Film Festival (中国国际女性影展).

See also
 HIV/AIDS in China

References
 One Man Against AIDS in China - NPR.org
 A Graduate Student and Children Orphaned by AIDS - Human Rights China Magazine
 Boston Globe: Transcript of interview with Li Dan

HIV/AIDS activists
1978 births
Chinese activists
Living people